Nail's Station was a stage stand on the old Butterfield Overland Mail route and the Texas Road in Indian Territory. Sometimes called Blue River Station or Nail's Crossing, it was located on the east side of Blue River in what is now Bryan County, Oklahoma. It was operated by Joel H. Nail, a member of a prominent Choctaw family.

Nail's Station was added to the National Register of Historic Places (#72001059) in 1972.

References

Sources
Shirk, George H. Oklahoma Place Names. Norman: University of Oklahoma Press, 1987:  .
Wright, Murial H.; George H. Shirk; Kenny A. Franks. Mark of Heritage. Oklahoma City: Oklahoma Historical Society, 1976.
Wright, Muriel H. "The Butterfield Overland Mail One Hundred Years Ago", Chronicles of Oklahoma 35:1 (January 1957) 55-71 (accessed August 19, 2006).

Buildings and structures in Bryan County, Oklahoma
Butterfield Overland Mail in Indian Territory
Stagecoach stations on the National Register of Historic Places in Oklahoma
Indian Territory
National Register of Historic Places in Bryan County, Oklahoma
Stagecoach stations in Oklahoma